Commonwealth is a district in Montserrado County in Liberia. The population was 11,876 in 2008, according to Population and Housing Census.

References 

Districts of Liberia
Montserrado County